KTPG (99.3 FM) is a radio station licensed to serve the community of Paragould, Arkansas, and broadcasting to the Jonesboro, Arkansas market. The station is owned by George S. Flinn, Jr. It airs a hot adult contemporary music format.

The station was assigned the KTPG call letters by the Federal Communications Commission on June 1, 2012.

References

External links
Official Website

TPG
Radio stations established in 2014
2014 establishments in Arkansas
Hot adult contemporary radio stations in the United States
Greene County, Arkansas